The Louisiana Public Service Commission (LPSC) is an independent regulatory agency which manages public utilities and motor carriers in Louisiana. The commission has five elected members chosen in single-member districts for staggered six-year terms. Thus the commissioners have large constituencies (bigger, e.g., than congressional districts), long terms (6 years), and close involvement with issues of intense consumer interest (such as electricity bills); consequently membership on LPSC has been known to serve as a springboard to even higher public office, as in the cases of Huey Long, Jimmie Davis, John McKeithen, and Kathleen Babineaux Blanco — LPSC members who became governors of Louisiana.

Jurisdiction
The LPSC is frequently in the news in Louisiana, largely because of its regulatory authority over investor-owned public utilities which offer electric, water, waste water, natural gas, as well as telecommunication services. It also regulates electric member-owned cooperatives, including those whose members have voted to vest the Commission with particular powers. The commission's authority does not extend within the city limits of New Orleans for electric retail services as that power is held by the city council. The LPSC also is not vested with some of its regulatory authority for those electric utilities which are municipally-owned and have greater than 50 MW of load; those powers are held by the city councils for those governments, including city of Lafayette, Louisiana. It regulates intrastate transportation, including passenger carrier services, waste haulers, household goods carriers, non-consensual towing, and intrastate pipelines. These issues are inseparable from often strongly held opinions by consumers and the regulated industries.  One of LPSC'S most-popular actions was its implementation, on January 1, 2002, of the "Do Not Call" program, which prohibits telemarketers from telephoning people who request that they not receive such calls.  The power of the LPSC was reduced by the Supreme Court in favor of the Federal Energy Regulatory Commission for determining electric generation costs in Entergy Louisiana, Inc. v. Louisiana Public Service Commission.

Background
Ever since its founding as the Railroad Commission of Louisiana in the state constitution of 1898, the LPSC has been politically powerful and involved, its districts being larger than congressional districts and the issues it has regulated (such as electricity bills) being immediately felt by voters. Thus, not surprisingly, four LPSC members have been elected governor of Louisiana: Huey Pierce Long, Jr., in 1928; James Houston "Jimmie" Davis in 1944; John Julian McKeithen in 1964 and 1968; and Kathleen Babineaux Blanco in 2003.

Davis recruited his 1944 and 1959 campaign manager from the LPSC staff, Chris Faser, Jr., later a member of the Louisiana House from East Baton Rouge Parish.

Another commissioner, Jay Blossman, abandoned the 2003 governor's race when opinion polls showed that he was making little headway. Blossman did not seek reelection in 2008. John G. Schwegmann, a New Orleans-area grocery store magnate who was defeated in the 1971 Democratic gubernatorial primary, was thereafter elected to the LPSC in the second half of the 1970s.

Other Louisiana political heavyweights who have served on the LPSC include Wade O. Martin, Sr., patriarch of another Louisiana political family, Harvey Fields, a former Huey Long law partner, and John S. Hunt, II, of Monroe, a nephew of Huey and Earl Kemp Long, who served on the commission from 1964 to 1972, when he was unseated by Ed Kennon. Hunt's mother was Lucille Long Hunt. Ernest Clements of Oberlin in Allen Parish was another protégé of the Longs who served on the commission.

Recent Elections
Early in 2009 the LPSC consisted of commissioners Foster L. Campbell, Jr., Jimmy Field, and Eric Skrmetta and a vacancy resulting from the resignation of Dale Sittig. Former U.S. Representative Clyde C. Holloway was effectively elected to replace Sittig when the other candidate in the special election runoff, state Senator Joe McPherson of Woodworth, conceded on April 13.

Campbell, a Democrat from Bossier City, has served on the LPSC since 2002, when he unseated his fellow Democrat Donald Lynn "Don" Owen of Shreveport, a former news anchor for KSLA-TV. Campbell failed in a gubernatorial bid in 2007. Owen had been elected to the LPSC in 1984, when then-incumbent Edward Kennon, declined to seek a third term. Kennon's uncle was Robert F. Kennon, governor of Louisiana from 1952 to 1956. Ed Kennon, a Shreveport developer, also ran unsuccessfully for lieutenant governor in the 1971 Democratic primary.

Dale Sittig of Eunice served on the LPSC from 1995 to 2008, when he resigned to accept a position with the Louisiana Offshore Oil Port. On April 13, 2009, McPherson conceded to Holloway, making Holloway effectively the commissioner-elect. Holloway ran for lieutenant governor in 2003 on a gubernatorial ticket headed by then Public Service Commissioner Jay Blossman, who withdrew from the race. Holloway remained a candidate for lieutenant governor but was crushed in the primary election.

In replacing Democrat Sittig, Holloway's addition to the LPSC (even including the forerunner Louisiana Railroad Commission) developed the body's first-ever Republican majority. Commissioners Jimmy Field and Eric Skrmetta are, like Holloway, Republican.  Simultaneously, the LPSC became the first statewide electoral group in Louisiana to develop a Republican majority since the Reconstruction era.

In 2013, Jimmy Field (no relation to Harvey Fields) retired. He served on the LPSC from 1996 to 2013 Field completed Blanco's term of office and won two further full terms. Field chose to step down rather than seek another term in 2012. Utilizing the 2010 census numbers, the Commission's electoral districts were redrawn by legislative act and the election for District 2 was the first to be contested using the new boundaries. Former Secretary of the Department of Natural Resources, Scott Angelle was elected to the seat.  Angelle was eligible as his home parish of Saint Martin became included in the 2nd District upon redistricting. In succeeding Field, Angelle ran first in a field of six. He won in the open non-partisan primary held on November 6, 2012. He defeated the second-place finisher, Democrat Forest Wright, an energy-policy analyst, and fellow Republican State Representative Erich Ponti in third place, and several other Republican and No-Party candidates.

In 2014, Eric Skrmetta was re-elected as the Commissioner from the 1st District defeating Democrat-turned-Republican Forest Wright. The typically obscure election was fiercely contested and colored by controversy over a firebombing incident targeted at Wright's campaign treasurer, Mario Zervigon. The key issue in the election was the ongoing rooftop solar debate. Incumbent Commissioner Skrmetta had enforced a limited cap on the number of homeowners in Louisiana who can install home solar panels and provide excess energy back to the grid under net metering. Candidate Wright supported expanding the availability of solar in the state and eliminating the cap. On November 4, Wright garnered enough votes to force a run-off, scheduled for December 6. The November 6th firebombing was questioned as being related to the contentious election.

On December 10, 2022, newcomer Davante Lewis defeated incumbent Lambert Boissiere for a seat on the Public Service Commission. The 30-year old Democrat and progressive policy advocate won support from environmentalists including a group affiliated with the Environmental Defense Fund for supporting the expanded use of renewable energy.

Current Commissioners

Eric Skrmetta, Republican, District 1
Craig Greene, Republican, District 2
Davante Lewis, Democrat, District 3
Mike Francis, Republican, District 4
Foster L. Campbell, Democrat, District 5

Controversy 
The Louisiana Public Service Commission has enabled and enforced a limited cap on net metering, preventing many homeowners from across the state from installing solar panels on their homes. The cap, which is lower than almost any other state in the country, has faced criticism from homeowners who want the ability to go solar to save money on their electric bills.

Some utilities in Louisiana have already begun to hit their cap. and new homeowners in those areas cannot install solar systems. If the Public Service Commission does not increase the cap, some solar companies may be forced to close or to leave the state.

On March 28, 2016, the commission in a 4-1 vote approved the sale of Cleco, an energy company based in Pineville, to a group of foreign investors: Macquarie Infrastructure and Real Assets, British Columbia Investment Management Corporation, John Hancock Financial, and other infrastructure investors. Earlier, the commission had disapproved the sale despite support from business leaders and Cleco investors. In his opposition, Commissioner Clyde Holloway expressed fear for "the long term consequences of Cleco's captive ratepayers. Cleco as we know it has ceased to exist. It is now owned by a private foreign investment company that plans to flip it in eight to ten years. And that same private foreign investment company is financing the deal with a massive amount of debt. ..."

Notes

External links
 Louisiana Public Service Commission official site
 Federal Trade Commission Staff Comment with Louisiana Officials about Rules Governing Regulated Utilities/Unregulated Affiliates

public service
Public utilities commissions of the United States